Zaynab al-Mariyya was an adība (woman of letters) and poet, most likely born in Almería, Andalusia, Spain.

Among Andalusian women poets, she left behind some of the fewest details of her life. Her surname implies that she was born in Almería, and the lack of a known lineage could indicate that she was a slave.

This would make Zaynab al-Mariyya a contemporary of al-Gassaniyya, another female poet in Almería.

Of her work, only one poem remains, a courtly love poem:You who ride after your desire,

wait, and I will tell you what I suffer.

Men do not dispute the love they feel,

but my passion for them exceeds their own.

It is enough for me to see my beloved happy,

and for his love and his happiness

I will push on until the end of time.

References 

People from Almería
11th-century Spanish women
11th-century Spanish poets
Spanish women poets
Women poets from al-Andalus
Medieval women poets
Slaves from al-Andalus